Admirals Beach is a rural community located in Newfoundland and Labrador, Canada.

Previously spelled Admiral's Beach, it is a fishing port located on the island of Newfoundland; specifically it is along a point of land in the southern Avalon Peninsula near Great Colinet Island fronting St. Mary's Bay.

The community was incorporated in January 1968.

Geography
Good fishing grounds and a sheltered cove attracted the first settlers to the area. The town is part of Division 1 and is bounded by St. Mary's Bay and the unorganized area Subdivision W. Nearby communities include St. Joseph's, Riverhead and St. Mary's.

History
Admirals Beach was first settled in the early nineteenth century by a French admiral. In 1864 there were three families living there. By 1911 it had a Post Office and a population of 39. The community grew over the years until a large population came from Great Colinet Island during the resettlement programme of 1956.  Its population in the 2016 Census was 135.

Demographics 

Economy
Although the majority of its residents were fishermen, Admirals Beach also had two ship building yards where fishing boats and longliners were built with supplies from local sawmills.

See also
 List of cities and towns in Newfoundland and Labrador

References

External links

Populated coastal places in Canada
Towns in Newfoundland and Labrador
Populated places established in the 19th century
Fishing communities in Canada